Edward R. Egan (January 3, 1930 – November 4, 1995) was an American actor and former police detective. He was the subject of the nonfiction book The French Connection and its 1971 film adaptation.

Life
Edward R. Egan was born in Queens, New York City on January 3, 1930, to Irish-American parents. Raised by his grandmother after being orphaned at age 12, he joined the United States Marine Corps in 1947. After his discharge, he played baseball for the New York Yankees' Triple-A club in 1950, but he was recalled to active duty for the Korean War. After his second discharge, he joined the New York City Police Department (NYPD) in 1955.

His career with the NYPD spanned 15 years, and he was reported to have been responsible for more than 8,000 arrests. Among his exploits, Egan (along with his partner Sonny Grosso and other NYPD detectives) broke up an organized crime ring in 1961, seizing 112 pounds of heroin, a record amount at the time. The investigation was chronicled in a 1969 book, The French Connection, by Robin Moore.

The book was adapted to a motion picture of the same name, released in 1971. The movie was highly fictionalized and very successful. The character based on Egan, Jimmy "Popeye" Doyle, was played by Gene Hackman who won an Academy Award for his performance (the film also won Oscars for Best Picture, Director, Screenplay, and Editing). The character was called "Popeye" because that was Egan's nickname in real life. Egan played a role in the movie as Hackman's supervisor, Simonson. Egan and Grosso were also technical advisors. Hackman reprised this role in the sequel film French Connection II in 1975, which depicts a fictionalized story.

Soon after the film was released, Egan asked to retire from the NYPD. On his retirement day in November 1971, he was fired for failing to make court appearances in conjunction with his cases and for failing to turn in contraband weapons and narcotics, losing him his pension benefits. He won an appeal and his pension was reinstated.

In 1973 another film, called Badge 373, with Robert Duvall playing the role of Egan, was released detailing Egan's career. Egan played Lt. Scanlon in the movie, once again (like in The French Connection) as an authority figure more or less sympathetic to the protagonist whose personality is based on himself. Also in 1973, ABC ordered and aired a television pilot entitled Egan, this time with Eugene Roche playing Egan, a tough NYPD cop transferred to Los Angeles, but it failed to go to series. In 1986, Fox developed Popeye Doyle, a proposed series based on the fictionalized character from the two films rather than Egan himself, with Ed O'Neill playing the title character. While the series was never produced, the pilot was broadcast as an NBC-TV Movie, and has been shown in syndication.

After retiring from the NYPD, Egan became a full-time actor, usually playing law enforcement figures. He portrayed the head of the NYPD's Son of Sam task force in the 1985 movie Out of the Darkness, and throughout his career he played roles in more than 20 movies and television series. He moved to Fort Lauderdale, Florida, in 1984.

Death
Egan died of colon cancer at the University of Miami Cancer Center, at the age of 65. He was engaged to Cheryl Kyle-Little at the time.

Filmography

Film

Television

References

External links
 
 

1930 births
1995 deaths
American people of Irish descent
New York City Police Department officers
Male actors from Fort Lauderdale, Florida
American male film actors
American male television actors
20th-century American male actors
French Connection
United States Marines
Deaths from cancer in Florida
Burials at Calverton National Cemetery